"Everywhere" is a song by American singer-songwriter Michelle Branch. Branch wrote the song when she was 15 in a more acoustic form, but after she met American record producer John Shanks, who provided additional songwriting, she recorded a more up-tempo version of the track in January and February 2001. Produced by Shanks, "Everywhere" is a pop rock song with ambiguous lyrics about having a crush on someone. Several music critics have compared the song's composition to works by Canadian singer Alanis Morissette. "Everywhere" was released on July 10, 2001, in the United States as Branch's debut single and the lead single from her first major-label studio album, The Spirit Room (2001). The single was also released in Australia and Europe throughout 2001 and 2002.

"Everywhere" received positive reviews from music critics, who called it a standout track from The Spirit Room due to its lively composition and catchy lyrics. The track has also aged well, with retrospective reviews giving similar praise to the song's composition and its chorus being ranked the 77th greatest of the 21st century by Billboard magazine in 2017. Commercially, "Everywhere" peaked at number 12 on the US Billboard Hot 100, reached the top 20 in Australia and the United Kingdom, and achieved top-five placings in the Netherlands and New Zealand. A music video directed by Liz Friedlander was also created for the single, featuring Branch stalking a man in an appartment building. The video won the Viewer's Choice Award at the 2002 MTV Video Music Awards. "Everywhere" remains Branch's most well-know song.

Background and release
Living with her parents in Sedona, Arizona, Michelle Branch wrote "Everywhere" when she was 15 years old, originally composing it as an acoustic love song. After she turned 17, Danny Strick, the executive A&R manager of Maverick Records, saw her performing as an opening act for pop rock band Hanson. Noticing that the crowd responded well to her music, he decided to sign her to the label in July 2000. She then played the song for John Shanks, who agreed to produce the track, and they recorded it from January to February 2001 at three studios in Hollywood, California: Sunset Sound, Henson Recording Studios, and Ananda Studios. Additional musicians who were present at the recording session include keyboardist Patrick Warren and drummers Kenny Aronoff and Vinnie Colaiuta.

Once Branch finished recording the track, Maverick promoted it at hot adult contemporary and contemporary hit radio in the United States, where it was officially serviced on July 10, 2001, eight days after Branch's 18th birthday. The Spirit Room was released on August 14, 2001, on which the song appears as the opening track. In Australia, "Everywhere" was released as a CD single on September 24, 2001, through Maverick and Warner Music Australia. This CD contains unplugged versions of Branch's future singles "All You Wanted" and "Goodbye to You". On April 1, 2002, Maverick issued the single across Europe and in the United Kingdom. In the UK, it was released on CD and cassette. The CD contains the unplugged versions of "All You Wanted" and "Everywhere" plus an enhanced element featuring the song's video, and the cassette contains the unplugged version of "Goodbye to You" only. The European CD single features the same tracks as the UK cassette. Maverick also distributed a promotional disc of "Everywhere" across Japan in 2001.

Composition

"Everywhere" was written by Branch and Shanks, who also produced the track. A vocally fervent love song, the track is written in common time with a moderate tempo of 98 beats per minute and was composed in the key of D major. "Everywhere" begins with a brisk acoustic riff that soon introduces electronic drums and eventually gives way to the complete instrumentation. According to Branch, she wrote the chorus a half step lower than the album version with falsetto vocals, but Shanks convinced her to raise the tone and sing as vigorously as she could. Stephanie Garr of online magazine The Dowsers described the song's essence as a combination of "moody post-grunge rock and breezy Y2K pop" and likened Branch's vocals to an optimistic Alanis Morissette, who was also signed to Maverick.

The lyrical content of the song, described by Billboard as "ultra-romantic", was left intentionally ambiguous by Branch, who did not write the song from personal experience. In 2001, Branch told MTV, "I like to keep my songs open-ended so people can listen to it and say, 'Oh, I think it means this. I've been through that.' Instead of having it be about" anything specific. Throughout the song, the narrator implies that she has been spending time with the person she likes, but the track's final line, "Do you see me?", jeopardizes this claim, insinuating that she has been observing her crush from afar. The song's hook was described by Patrick Crowley of Billboard as a "beast of a glossy pop-rock hook" and responsible for the song's catchiness. Branch later commented that the she had written better refrains since then but remains proud of her work. In retrospective comments, Branch said that the material of her first two albums, including "Everywhere", is "hopelessly romantic" compared with her later work and composed of "a lot of [...] teenage rhyme".

Critical reception

"Everywhere" received high praise from music critics. Billboard editor Chuck Taylor likened the song to a "shot of tequila" when compared with other pop music of the time, praising its mood, lyrics, and production. Chris Edge of Raleigh-Durham radio station WDCG said that the track conveys Branch's passion through its "incredible hook" and lyrics and praised its relatability. In Hasselt, Belgium, FM Limburg head of music Sandra Boussu labeled the track "cool and hip", comparing Branch to Morissette and Dutch singer Sita. AllMusic's Liana Jonas described the song "a lively and heartfelt song with electric-guitar power chords, spirited vocal delivery, and catchy chorus". Sputnikmusic reviewed the song, calling it the album's standout track. IGN Music called the song "definitely catchy". Sean Richardson of the Boston Phoenix described the song's intro as "glossy", going on to label the chorus as "unforgettable dream-pop" and comparing the track to Vanessa Carlton's debut single, "A Thousand Miles". British chart commentator James Masterton wrote that the song charted in the UK on its own merits and noted Branch's "tremendous" voice as well as the "uplifting" lyrics.

Retrospectively, Post Grad Problems writer Charlie labeled "Everywhere" the perfect song, citing its attention-grabbing instrumental disparity and noting that changing anything in the chorus would have downgraded the song's quality, despite calling the rhyming scheme "sloppy". In 2017, Billboard ranked the song's chorus as the 77th-best of 21st century, referring to the second half as a "testament" to the entire refrain. Garr noted that "Everywhere" marked the end of the "'90s angst" era and served as an influence for future female pop stars such as Kelly Clarkson, KT Tunstall, Sara Bareilles, and Hayley Williams of Paramore. Abby Jones of pop culture website Pop Dust named the track one of the best Radio Disney throwback hits, writing that it has aged well and noting its strong chorus. In September 2022, Emily Yahr of The Washington Post commented on the song's nostalgia factor, writing that it "transport[s] a significant portion of the population back to the simpler times of watching MTV after school, dramatic AIM away messages and piling friends into a car fresh off getting a driver's license and cranking up the radio".

Chart performance
"Everywhere" is Branch's most successful song. On the US Billboard Hot 100, "Everywhere" debuted at number 62 on September 1, 2001, becoming that week's highest-charting new song. Ten weeks later, on November 10, the song peaked at number 12, giving Branch her first of four top-20 singles in the US. The song spent a total of 20 weeks on the Hot 100, last charting at number 63 on January 7, 2002. On other Billboard charts, the song achieved its highest position on the Mainstream Top 40, where it peaked at number five and spent 26 weeks on the ranking. The song also reached the top 10 on the Adult Top 40 and Top 40 Tracks listings, reaching numbers nine and six, respectively. The track appeared on the Adult Top 40 year-end chart for 2001, ranking in at number 26.

In Australia, "Everywhere" debuted at number 100 on the ARIA Singles Chart in November 2001, rising into the top 50 on January 13, 2002. In late March, the song rose into the top 20 and peaked at number 19, becoming Branch's highest-charting single in Australia and staying inside the top 50 for 15 weeks. At the end of 2002, the Australian Recording Industry Association (ARIA) ranked the song at number 87 on their year-end chart. In New Zealand, the single first appeared at number 45 on the RIANZ Singles Chart in November 2001. Over the next six weeks, the track rose up the top 50, eventually peaking at number two on December 16. Spending 16 weeks within the top 50, it remains Branch's highest-charting single in New Zealand.

"Everywhere" also charted in several European countries, achieving a peak of number 84 on the Eurochart Hot 100 in April 2002. In the United Kingdom, the single debuted and peaked at number 18 on the UK Singles Chart the same month, totaling six weeks in the top 100. It is Branch's second-highest-peaking single in the UK, after "The Game of Love", her collaboration with rock band Santana. On the Netherlands' Dutch Top 40 chart, "Everywhere" became a top-five hit, reaching number five in March 2002, while on the country's Single Top 100 chart, it reached number 28. According to the Dutch Top 40, "Everywhere" was the Netherlands' 84th-best-performing hit of 2002. In Italy, the track reached number 28 on the FIMI Singles Chart. Elsewhere in Europe, the single peaked at number 46 in Switzerland and charted below the top 50 in France, Germany, Sweden, and Switzerland.

Music video

The music video for "Everywhere" was directed by Liz Friedlander and was filmed after the song was added to radio. The video shows Branch stalking a man in the opposite apartment building while she takes several photographs of him and plays her guitar in an empty room. He also glimpses back at her, and at the end of the video, the two finally meet. Branch was involved in the selection of the actor portraying her love interest; she told MTV in a 2001 interview that when the producers showed her a photo of Jake Muxworthy, she told them, "This is it. He has to be in it." Playing opposite Muxworthy proved to be difficult for Branch, who reportedly had a "little crush" on him, and she admitted in 2017 that she was a "peeping Tom" in the video.

The video received airings on Fox Family, Nickelodeon, and VH1 before its intended release date, and it was also popular on MTV's Total Request Live (TRL), where Branch performed the song live on August 24, 2001. Regarding the video, pop culture website Cool Accidents wrote that it is so "painstakingly 2000s" that it exemplifies the cultural trends of 2001, while Jones labeled it "painfully 2001". The music video won the Viewer's Choice Award at the 2002 MTV Video Music Awards.

Track listings
Australian maxi-CD single
 "Everywhere" – 3:36
 "All You Wanted" (unplugged version) – 3:36
 "Goodbye to You" (unplugged version) – 4:09

UK CD single
 "Everywhere" – 3:36
 "All You Wanted" (unplugged version) – 3:36
 "Goodbye to You" (unplugged version) – 4:09
 "Everywhere" (promotional video)

UK cassette single and European CD single
 "Everywhere" – 3:36
 "Goodbye to You" (unplugged version) – 4:09

Credits and personnel
Credits are lifted from The Spirit Room album booklet.

Studios
 Recorded at Sunset Sound, Henson Recording Studios, and Ananda Studios (Hollywood, California)
 Mixed at Image Recorders (Hollywood, California)
 Mastered at Marcussen Mastering (Los Angeles)

Personnel

 Michelle Branch – writing, guitars, keyboards
 John Shanks – writing, guitars, bass, keyboards, programming, production
 Patrick Warren – keyboards
 Kenny Aronoff – drums
 Vinnie Colaiuta – drums
 Lars Fox – programming, engineering, Pro Tools editing
 Chris Lord-Alge – mixing
 Marc DeSisto – engineering
 Stephen Marcussen – mastering

Charts

Weekly charts

Year-end charts

Release history

References

2001 debut singles
2001 songs
Maverick Records singles
Michelle Branch songs
Music videos directed by Liz Friedlander
Song recordings produced by John Shanks
Songs written by John Shanks
Songs written by Michelle Branch
Warner Music Group singles